Brandon Randolph McDonald (born August 26, 1985) is a former American gridiron football cornerback. He was drafted by the Cleveland Browns in the fifth round of the 2007 NFL Draft. He played college football at Memphis.

McDonald has also played for the Arizona Cardinals, Detroit Lions, Tampa Bay Buccaneers, Ottawa Redblacks, Calgary Stampeders and Saskatchewan Roughriders.

College career
McDonald played Junior College football at Jones County Junior College and transferred to the University of Memphis and started two years there. He lettered for two seasons at JCJC under Coach Parker Dykes. He worked as a receiver during his first season and in the secondary in 2004. He also led JCJC in punt returns during junior college.  He was an education major.

Professional career

Cleveland Browns
McDonald was selected by the Cleveland Browns in the fifth round (140th overall) in the 2007 NFL Draft. He made his NFL debut versus the Pittsburgh Steelers on September 9. McDonald had superb performances in games against the Houston Texans in which he had 3 tackles, 4 passes defended, and his 1st career interception, and the New York Jets in which he had 5 tackles, 2 passes defensed and 1 interception.

He finished the season with 16 games played including 2 starts, 24 tackles, 10 passes defensed, and 2 interceptions.

After an injury to teammate Daven Holly, McDonald started for the Cleveland Browns in 2008. He recorded 64 tackles, 11 assists and 5 interceptions. On December 15, 2008, against the Eagles, McDonald returned an interception, right before halftime, 98 yards only to be tackled out of bounds at the 7 yard line. This play set the record for the longest return in NFL history to not result in a touchdown. Later in the game, McDonald did return an interception 22 yards for a touchdown,

The 2009 campaign for Brandon McDonald was a difficult one for him, after being burned many times and eventually being replaced in the starting lineup by safety Mike Adams who outperformed him. He recorded 55 tackles, 1 sack, and 1 interceptions in the 2009 season. 2009 was also the year Steve McNair was murdered. He was Brandon Mcdonald's cousin.

McDonald was cut a week before the start of the 2010 season.

Arizona Cardinals
On September 5, 2010, McDonald was claimed off waivers by the Arizona Cardinals from the Browns. He was waived on October 26.

Detroit Lions
On October 27, 2010, McDonald was claimed off waivers by the Detroit Lions.

Tampa Bay Buccaneers
McDonald was signed by the Tampa Bay Buccaneers on August 20, 2012.

Miami Dolphins
On November 7, 2012, he was claimed off waivers by the Miami Dolphins.

Calgary Stampeders
McDonald was signed by the Calgary Stampeders on July 16, 2014. He was released by the Stampeders on September 3, 2014.

Ottawa Redblacks
McDonald signed with the Ottawa Redblacks  on September 15, 2014. Part-way through the 2015 CFL season McDonald was released by the Redblacks because he committed too many penalties.

Personal life
McDonald was born August 26, 1985 to Lisa McDonald Gant and James Spencer in Collins MS. He is a 2003 graduate of Collins High School where he was a contributing member of the repeat State Champion Tigers (back-to-back) under Head Coach Bruce Merchant.  He also lettered in basketball and baseball.  He is the cousin of former NFL running back Correll Buckhalter and former NFL quarterback Steve McNair.

References

External links
Tampa Bay Buccaneers bio
Memphis Tigers bio
Cleveland Browns bio
Ottawa Redblacks bio

1985 births
Living people
Players of American football from Mississippi
American football cornerbacks
Canadian football defensive backs
African-American players of American football
African-American players of Canadian football
Jones County Bobcats football players
Memphis Tigers football players
Cleveland Browns players
Arizona Cardinals players
Detroit Lions players
Tampa Bay Buccaneers players
Calgary Stampeders players
Ottawa Redblacks players
Saskatchewan Roughriders players
People from Collins, Mississippi
21st-century African-American sportspeople
20th-century African-American people